É Fada! is a 2016 Brazilian comedy film, directed by Cris D'Amato. It is a film inspired by the book "Uma Fada Veio Me Visitar", by the author Thalita Rebouças, starring Kéfera Buchmann, Klara Castanho, Bruna Griphao, Mariana Santos and Sílvio Guindane.

The film was released in Brazilian cinemas on October 6, 2016.

Plot
Geraldine (Kéfera Buchmann) is a fairy who lost her wings by using unconventional methods in her missions. Her last chance to retrieve them will be the mission "Julia".

Cast 
 Kéfera Buchmann as Geraldine (Fairy)
 Klara Castanho as Julia Ribeiro Pontes
 Sílvio Guindane as Vicente Pontes, Julia's father
 Mariana Santos as Alice Ribeiro, Julia's mother
 Bruna Griphao as Verônica
 Isabella Moreira as Ingrid
 Clara Tiezzi as Priscila
 João Fernandes as Pedro
 Christian Monassa as Maureba
 Junior Vieira as Ankô (Elf)
 Carla Daniel as Mrs Hermínia
 Claudia Mauro as Dance teacher

References

External links
 

2010s Portuguese-language films
Brazilian comedy films
2016 comedy films
Films about fairies and sprites
Films shot in Rio de Janeiro (city)
Films set in Rio de Janeiro (city)